The F-plan is a high-fibre diet designed to induce healthy weight loss, created in the 1980s by British author Audrey Eyton, founder of Slimming Magazine, and based on the work of Denis Burkitt. The book F-Plan Diet was in the top ten best selling books in America in April and May 1983. The diet works by restricting the daily intake of calories to less than 1,500 whilst consuming well above the recommended level of dietary fibre. The fibre has a number of beneficial effects, such as making the dieter feel "full" for much longer than normal, reducing the urge to overeat, and promoting a healthy digestive system.

The disadvantages include excessive flatulence in the first few weeks and having to eat food that is harder work to chew and swallow. Some people also express a dislike of the texture of such a high fibre diet. The dieter will need to consume more water than usual to prevent constipation.

Nevertheless, the diet is very effective when followed faithfully and remains a popular choice of diet.

In 2006 Audrey Eyton published F2, a revised version of the F-plan written in the light of subsequent medical discoveries, which claims to be faster and more effective and campaigns against low-carbohydrate diets, particularly the Atkins Diet.

See also

Pritikin diet

References

External links
Detailed description of the diet

Brand name diet products
Diets
Fad diets
High-fiber diets